Georgy Nissky was a prominent Soviet painter and a founder of the severe style. He was named a People's Artist of the USSR in 1965 and won a third degree Stalin Prize in 1951.

In 2019, an exhibition of his work was held at the Institute of Russian Realist Art.

References

Stalin Prize winners
Soviet painters
People's Artists of the USSR (visual arts)
Burials at Kuntsevo Cemetery
Russian landscape painters